Colleen McCabe (born 1952) is a former British schoolteacher, schoolmaster and former religious sister, who stole up to £500,000 from the school where she worked.

Early years
From 1974 to 1989, McCabe was a member of the Daughters of Charity of Saint Vincent de Paul. After 15 years she decided to leave that community, and joined the faculty of the state-funded Roman Catholic St John Rigby School where she was made headteacher in 1991.

Before her extravagant spending was revealed, McCabe had been praised as a headmistress for her strong discipline in the school and for improving the school's facilities. She made the school grant-maintained in 1995, thus allowing the head to have complete control over the school's budget, having received the permission from the school's governors. The fraud was detected only after the school reverted to government control in 1999.

Spending
McCabe lavished money from the budget on clothes, shoes, jewellery, trips, takeaways and wine for the governors' meetings, champagne receptions and three holidays to Malta.

This was achieved with cutbacks, including: 
 using her pupils and contract cleaners for cleaning
 shutting down the school heaters
 asking children to work with old textbooks and computers
 sacking, or underpaying, teachers.

Conviction
McCabe was convicted of all eleven charges of theft and six charges of deception. She was originally jailed for five years, but this was reduced to four years on appeal. She was released in December 2005, after serving half of her sentence.

Television
McCabe was portrayed by Pauline Quirke in the 2006 BBC Two docu-drama The Thieving Headmistress.

References

External links
A piece from the Guardian newspaper, "A theft too far", guardian.co.uk; accessed 25 June 2014.

1952 births
Living people
Daughters and Sisters of Charity of St. Vincent de Paul
20th-century English Roman Catholic nuns
Former Roman Catholic religious sisters and nuns
Heads of schools in London
British fraudsters
British people of Irish descent
Date of birth missing (living people)
Place of birth missing (living people)
Women heads of schools in the United Kingdom